Second Time Lucky is a 1984 New Zealand erotic comedy film directed by Michael Anderson and starring Diane Franklin and Roger Wilson. The story centres on God and the Devil making a bet on the definitive salvation or condemnation of humanity, as well as the couple that will decide mankind's fate.

Synopsis 
Satan calls God by phone and asks him how is he doing, and if he is not tired of their eternal dispute for mankind's fate. Both decide to set up a definitive game, which will decide if humans deserve one last chance to reach Heaven or if they will be condemned forever to hell. They settle that Eve and Adam, an ordinary 20th Century couple, will be their "players"; travelling through time while fighting (or giving in) to temptation and carnal desire. Adam and Eve are then plunged back through time into a series of tableaus to test them: the Garden of Eden, Ancient Rome, World War I, The Roaring Twenties and current modern times.

Cast 
 Diane Franklin as Eve
 Roger Wilson as Adam
 Jon Gadsby as the Angel Gabriel 
 Robert Helpmann as the Devil 
 Robert Morley as God 
 John Michael Howson as the Devil's Assistant
 Bill Ewens as Chuck
 Eunice Ewens as Abby 
 Erna Larsen as Suzy 
 John Hudson as Jimmy 
 Gay Dean as Spinster
 Brenda Kendall as Dykin
 Onno Boelee as Ripperus
 Melissa Miles as Sue 
 Paul Owen-Lowe as Roman guard
 Derek Payne as Colonel Anderson
 Norman Fairley as German officer
 David Weatherley as British officer 
 Don Kjestrup as Inn-keeper

References

Bibliography
New Zealand Film 1912-1996 by Helen Martin & Sam Edwards p102 (1997, Oxford University Press, Auckland) –

External links
 

1984 films
1980s New Zealand films
1980s English-language films
1980s erotic films
1980s sex comedy films
Obscenity controversies in film
New Zealand independent films
Films directed by Michael Anderson
New Zealand comedy films
Cultural depictions of Adam and Eve
The Devil in film
Fiction about God
1984 comedy films